Entomostoma entomostoma is a species of air-breathing land snails, terrestrial pulmonate gastropod mollusks in the family Trochomorphidae.

Distribution
This species occurs on the Caroline Islands.

References

 Mollusc Specialist Group 1996.  Brazieria entomostoma.   2006 IUCN Red List of Threatened Species.   Downloaded on 6 August 2007.

Entomostoma
Gastropods described in 1841